Anastasija Reiberger, née Ryzhikh (born 19 September 1977 in Omsk) is a Russian-born German pole vaulter. She is the older sister of fellow pole vaulter Lisa Ryzih. Her greatest success was the gold medal in the 1999 World Indoor Championships.

As of 2016, this ranks her tenth among German pole vaulters.

Biography
After living in Russia as a child, father Vladimir Ryzhikh moved his family to the German city of Ulm in 1992. He was a pioneer of pole vault in Germany and introduced his children to the sport.  Soon, his elder daughter "Nastja", as she was then called, flourished in this sport (like her younger sister Lisa Ryzih later), setting several junior records and participating for Germany after obtaining German citizenship when she was 18. For her German passport, her first name was transcribed in German ("Настя" = "Nastja"; "Nastya" in English transcription) and her family name in French ("Рыжих" = "Ryjikh"; "Ryzhikh" in English transcription)

Ryzhikh's greatest success was the gold medal in the 1999 world indoor championships in Maebashi. In 2000, she made headlines when she posed nude for the German Max lifestyle magazine. Unfortunately, she struggled with several injuries later, which caused her to decline. After some meagre years, she returned to the German elite by becoming German outdoor vice champion twice (2005, 2006).

In 2007, Ryjikh married. Long referred to as "Nastja Ryzhikh" (with countless name variations due to the unusual transcription), she decided to take on the last name of her husband and wanted to be officially referred to as "Anastasija", changing her name to Anastasija Reiberger.

Clubs
 SG Ulm (-1993)
 LAZ Zweibrücken (1993–99)
 ABC Ludwigshafen (1999–present)

See also
 Germany all-time top lists - Pole vault

References

External links
 
 Anastasija Reiberger's DLV page

1977 births
Living people
German female pole vaulters
Olympic athletes of Germany
Athletes (track and field) at the 2008 Summer Olympics
Russian emigrants to Germany
Sportspeople from Ulm
World Athletics Indoor Championships winners